Kelly Richey (born November 30, 1962) is an American blues rock guitarist, singer and composer based out of Cincinnati, Ohio.

Early life
Kelly Richey was born and raised in Lexington, Kentucky, United States, in a conservative Christian household that avoided rock music. Her first instrument was the piano. Her second instrument was a drum kit that her neighbor let her take home. After a couple of months of playing drums in her bedroom, her father offered to buy her anything she wanted; she chose the guitar. She started learning guitar at age 15; she reached a point where she was practicing 12 hours a day.

Career
Kelly Richey joined Kopana Terry, Kiya Heartwood and Tony Nagy in 1986. In 1988 she sat in with Albert King at the Cuckoo Club in Nashville. In 1990, she formed The Kelly Richey Band (KRB). In 1997 she moved from Lexington, Kentucky to Mount Auburn, Cincinnati. Writing of her 2001 album Sending Me Angels, Guitar Player praised her "fiery solos" and her "fast, powerful picking hand", which she credited to having played as a drummer. She cites Roy Buchanan as an influence, besides Stevie Ray Vaughan, Jimi Hendrix and Lonnie Mack. She released eleven albums between 1994 and 2008. Her 2006 album Speechless consisted entirely of instrumentals. She took a break from performing in 2010.

Equipment
Richey plays a 1965 Fender Stratocaster, the same she has played since the 1980s. It has a 1963 body and a 1965 neck, with a traditional Fender tremolo; the pickups are Seymour Duncan and she uses SIT strings (.10-.046). She plays through a Fender Super Reverb with an Ibanez Tube Screamer.

Discography

 1994: Sister's Gotta Problem
 1995: The Blues Don't Lie
 1996: Live at Tommy's On Main
 1997: Eyes of a Woman
 1998: Dig a Little Deeper
 1999: Kelly Richey Band Live
 2001: Sending Me Angels
 2003: Kelly Richey Live...As It Should Be
 2004: Kelly Richey Live
 2006: Speechless
 2007: The Kelly Richey Band Live at the Thirsty Ear
 2008: Carry the Light
 2013: Sweet Spirit
 2014: Live at the Blue Wisp

References

External links

List of articles and reviews from national magazines
KET television show
Interview

1962 births
Living people
American blues guitarists
American blues singers
American women singers
Musicians from Cincinnati
20th-century American guitarists
Guitarists from Ohio
20th-century American women guitarists
21st-century American women